Bennett Township is one of fifteen townships in Fillmore County, Nebraska, United States. The population was 66 at the 2020 census.

References

External links
City-Data.com

Townships in Fillmore County, Nebraska
Townships in Nebraska